Sadulpur from parts of Rajgarh tehsil, which include ILRC Rajgarh including Rajgarh Municipal Board, ILRC Hamirawas Bara, ILRC Ragha Chhoti, ILRC Sankhoo, ILRC Chainpura Chhota and ILRC Sidhmukh.

Members of Legislative Assembly

References

See also 
 Member of the Legislative Assembly (India)

Churu district
Assembly constituencies of Rajasthan